Two radio stations used the call letters WBAD.

WBAD (94.3 FM) is a radio station broadcasting an Urban music format. Licensed to Leland, Mississippi, United States.  The station is currently owned by Interchange Communications.

Another WBAD was an FM pirate (legally unauthorized) radio station broadcasting from Brooklyn's  Windsor Terrace neighborhood from 1995–1998. WBAD-Bad Radio was founded by Dave Cintron (DJ Cintronics). They played uncensored hip-hop music, in contrast to "Hot97 "WQHT. NYC's licensed commercial Hip Hop station.

References

External links 
 WBAD-FM 94.3 BAD FM Facebook
 

BAD
Urban contemporary radio stations in the United States